No Wyld (formerly known as The Wyld) is a New Zealand alternative hip hop band, formed in 2010.

History
Mohamed "Mo" Kheir and Joe Pascoe met while studying architecture at university in 2007. They joined Brandon Black two years later through Kheir's older brother, Moomin Kheir. They began covering tracks they liked, and performing at open mic nights.

"Revolution" was the first single that attracted attention online. The track earned praise from MTV Iggy in the United States and was subsequently included in United States TV show 90210.

The band attracted the interest of major sponsors like Red Bull, who included them in a major campaign. In August 2013, they began recording their first EP, Abstract, at Red Bull Studios. The Wyld relocated to the United States where Band Manager, Michelle Bakker secured a recording contract with Columbia records in 2013 and then a Publishing deal with Sony ATV in April 2014.

The track "Odyssey" was used in a commercial for McDonald's during Sochi 2014 secured by Band Manager Michelle Bakker, and later included in the soundtrack for NHL 15, Madden NFL 16 and Need for Speed. "Odyssey" was also featured in the pregame video played before the West Virginia University Mountaineers football team took the field for home games during the 2015 season. In addition, "Let Me Know" was included in the soundtrack for FIFA 16.

This song also appeared in EA Sports game, FIFA 17 with "Justfayu" featuring KAMAU. Their song "Air" was used as the official theme song for WWE's Elimination Chamber event in 2017.

Band members
 Mohamed "Mo" Kheir – Vocals
 Brandon Black – Vocals, Production
 Joseph Pascoe – Guitar, Production

Discography

Studio albums

Extended plays

Singles

As lead artist

As featured artist

Music videos

References

New Zealand indie rock groups